The women's points race at the 2008 Summer Olympics took place on August 18 at the Laoshan Velodrome.

This track cycling event consists of a single race. This race is a 25 kilometre, 100 lap race. During the race, cyclists can score points in two ways; the cyclist with the most points at the end of the race wins. The first way to score points is to lap the group. Each time a cyclist gained a full lap on the peloton, she scored 20 points. If a cyclist lost a full lap to the peloton, however, she would lose 20 points. The other method of scoring points was to place in the intermediate sprints, held every 10 laps. The first four cyclists in each of those sprints would score, with the first finisher getting 5 points, the second 3, the third 2, and the fourth 1 point.

Results

References

Track cycling at the 2008 Summer Olympics
Cycling at the Summer Olympics – Women's points race
Olymp
Women's events at the 2008 Summer Olympics